Lozice is a village in the upper Vipava Valley, under the western slopes of Mount Nanos in the Municipality of Vipava in the Littoral region of Slovenia.

Church

The parish church in the settlement is dedicated to Saint Francis Xavier and belongs to the Koper Diocese.

References

External links

Lozice at Geopedia

Populated places in the Municipality of Vipava